Richard Bolton may refer to:
Richard Bolton (lawyer) (1570–1648), English lawyer in Ireland
Richard Bolton (rugby league) (born 1943), New Zealand rugby league footballer

See also
Richard Scrope, 1st Baron Scrope of Bolton (1327–1403), English soldier and courtier
Richard Boulton (1697–1724), English medical and science writer